Michael Kwasi Ossei was a Ghanaian politician and was a member of the first parliament of the second Republic of Ghana. He represented the  Koforidua constituency under the membership of the Progress Party (PP).

Early life and education 
Osei was born on 16 July 1918 in the Eastern region of Ghana. He attended  Koforidua Methodist School now Koforidua Effiduase Methodist School, Koforidua, Ghana where he obtained his Teachers' Training Certificate. He then moved to Cape Coast to advance his education at St. Augustine's College, Cape Coast, Ghana where he obtained his Bachelor of Arts degree. He worked as a teacher before going into parliament.

Politics 
Ossei began his political career in 1969 when he became the parliamentary candidate for the Progress Party (PP)  to represent the Koforidua constituency prior to the commencement of the 1969 Ghanaian parliamentary election. He assumed office as a member of the first parliament of the second Republic of Ghana on 1 October 1969 after being a pronounced winner at the 1969 Ghanaian parliamentary election. His tenure ended on 13 January 1972.

Personal life 
Ossei was a Catholic.

References 

1918 births
Year of death missing
Ghanaian MPs 1969–1972
Progress Party (Ghana) politicians
People from Eastern Region (Ghana)